Wall is a village in Northumberland, England situated to the north of Hexham close by the River North Tyne and Hadrian's Wall. The Battle of Heavenfield was fought nearby. The village has one pub and a garage.

Governance 

Wall is in the parliamentary constituency of Hexham.

Transport  
Wall was served by Wall railway station on the Border Counties Railway which linked the Newcastle and Carlisle Railway, near Hexham, with the Border Union Railway at Riccarton Junction. The first section of the route was opened between Hexham and Chollerford in 1858, the remainder opening in 1862. The line was closed to passengers by British Railways in 1956.

The station, and signal box, still stands and is now in use as a private house.

References

 
Villages in Northumberland
Civil parishes in Northumberland